"Three Dreams Denied" is the seventh episode of the thirty-second season of the American animated television series The Simpsons, and the 691st episode overall. It aired in the United States on Fox on November 22, 2020. The episode was directed by Steven Dean Moore and written by Danielle Weisberg.

Ben Platt guest-stars in the episode as Blake, while Paul Rudd appears as himself. In the episode, Comic Book Guy goes to Comicalooza, Bart becomes a voice-over actor, and Lisa gets a new rival at school. It also received generally positive reviews, and was watched live in the United States by 4.41 million viewers.

Plot 
After Agnes Skinner sells her son's Radioactive Man doll to him for cheap, Comic Book Guy sells it online, which allows him to go on his dream trip to Comicalooza. On the plane, Comic Book Guy tries to come up with the perfect question to ask at a panel, in hopes of being given a job at Marvel Studios. Outside of Comicalooza he manages to come up with a question, but when his turn comes, he forgets it. He returns to Springfield despondent, but cheers himself up again by abusing Ralph Wiggum.

Meanwhile, Lisa meets a new boy in school named Blake, who she is happy to learn also plays the saxophone. However, Blake tricks Lisa into losing her chair at school. However, Lisa realizes that she can play her saxophone outside of school and decides to play at the mall, where she finds out that other people really appreciate her music.

Bart meets a voice-over actor who gets him a job at an animated TV show. Bart invites Nelson Muntz and his friends over to watch his show. Upon watching it, Bart finds out he voices a princess, which causes the others to make fun of him. Later, Bart's character ends up actually being a ruthless killer, which impresses everyone.

In a mid-credits scene, Comic Book Guy can be seen sitting on a bench outside Comicalooza, writing questions. He asks why the first thing people think when they see Superman is a bird, and proposes a Superhero called "SuperSpiderBat," a combination of Superman, Spider-Man, and Batman. In the background, many pop culture characters (or people cosplaying as them) can be seen, including Robin, a Minecraft guy, Matt Groening, Morbo from Futurama, Deadpool, Poison Ivy, and Ahsoka Tano perched atop Anakin Skywalker.

Production
Ben Platt appeared in the episode as Blake and Paul Rudd appeared as himself. Rudd previously guest-starred in two other episodes. Dawnn Lewis also appears as an airplane stewardess. On 2020, Fox released eight promotional pictures from the episode.

Reception

Viewing figures
In the United States, the episode was watched live by 4.41 million viewers.

Critical response
Tony Sokol with Den of Geek said, "The Simpsons are always self-referential, but it gets very subliminal in 'Three Dreams Denied.' ... This week, Bart is playing a voiceover actor. I’m sure Professor Frink could come up with some reason this somehow flays the laws of animation physics. This is probably why the episode falls short. No one episode of The Simpsons can handle the voiceover click-track continuum, smooth jazz and the ultimate question to ask at Comicalooza. It’s just too much. In the past, The Simpsons could have borne the extra weight. They’ve always had cross plots, subplots and occasional mini-arcs which play out under the radar. Each of the three stories are strong, funny and have the pathos or peril needed to make them great. In that sense, 'Three Dreams Denied' is very much operating in The Simpsons early mode. While the journey flies by without too many bumps, the episode lives up to its title." He also gave the episode three out of five stars.

References

2020 American television episodes
The Simpsons (season 32) episodes